Reginald Faithful "Rex" Palmer (16 February 1896 – 12 October 1972)  was a British broadcaster.  He was an early BBC Radio presenter who made programmes for children under the pseudonym "Uncle Rex", and sang on air as "Rex Faithful".

Life 
Palmer was born in Lincoln, England.  In the First World War, he served with the Royal Flying Corps under Edmund Allenby in Palestine.

Palmer was the first London Station Director of 2LO, and was the first person appointed to the BBC's predecessor, the British Broadcasting Company, by John (later Lord) Reith, in November 1922.  He became known as "The Golden Voice of Wireless".  He presented children's programmes from 1923, and also presented concert programmes and sang as a baritone. On leaving the BBC in 1929, to join the Gramophone Company, he was described by the Evening News as "one of the original five members of the BBC".

On 11 October 1931, he introduced the first English-language radio programme in France, A Concert of HMV Records on Radio Paris, which was sponsored by HMV and made by the International Broadcasting Company. At the Gramophone Company, where he rose to be general manager of the International Artistes' Department, he oversaw recordings for the His Master's Voice (HMV) label, by conductors and composers including Sir Edward Elgar and Arturo Toscanini. He left HMV in 1940. 

He also narrated films for British Pathé.

He rejoined the Royal Air Force (as it had become) in World War II, eventually becoming a Wing Commander.

Palmer returned to the BBC to present nostalgic programmes such as Those Were the Days and These Radio Times in the 1950s. He appeared as a castaway on the BBC Radio programme Desert Island Discs on 10 February 1958.

He died in London in 1972, aged 76, and was buried at Brompton Cemetery.  In November 2008, his papers were auctioned by Bonhams.

References

External links 
 The Magic Box Aka Jack Hylton & HMV 1931 British Pathé newsreel, featuring Palmer's narration

1896 births
People from Lincoln, England
1972 deaths
BBC radio presenters
Royal Air Force officers
Royal Flying Corps officers
British record producers
Children's radio
British Army personnel of World War I
Royal Air Force personnel of World War II